Jacob H. Braun (born October 3, 1975) is an American politician, cyber and national security expert. He was appointed by President Joseph Biden as the U.S. Department of Homeland Security (DHS) Secretary's Senior Advisor to the Management Directorate. Braun is also a lecturer at the University of Chicago’s Harris School of Public Policy Studies where he teaches courses on cyber policy and election security. He previously served as the Executive Director for the University of Chicago Harris Cyber Policy Initiative (CPI).

From 2009 to 2011, Braun served as White House Liaison to the U.S. Department of Homeland Security. He has also served as National Deputy Field Director for Obama for America in 2008 and as the Michigan Field Director for John Kerry in 2004.

Braun is co-founder of the DEF CON Voting Machine Hacking Village (Voting Village) hacker conference. He is the former CEO of Cambridge Global Advisors (CGA), a bipartisan consulting firm based in Washington, DC.

Education 
Braun is a graduate of Troy St. University where he earned an MA in International Relations. He also has a Master’s in Secondary Education from National Louis University in Chicago and a BA in Philosophy from Loyola University of Chicago.

Career
Braun began his career as a journalist reporting for newspapers in Illinois and Taiwan.  Braun has worked on political campaigns for Democratic and progressive candidates. He has headed initiatives for the Democratic National Committee (DNC), Democratic Congressional Campaign Committee (DCCC) and multiple state Democratic Party committees. He was National Deputy Field Director to the 2008 Obama for America Campaign.  Braun previously oversaw the field program for John Kerry’s 2004 presidential campaign in Michigan and worked in Iowa during the 2004 presidential primary.

Braun served on the Presidential Transition Team in 2008-2009 for the Obama Administration as Deputy Director for the National Security Agencies Review, which oversaw the agency review process for the State Department, DOD, DHS, CIA, USAID. He was appointed White House Liaison to the U.S. Department of Homeland Security on January 21, 2009, where he facilitated key DHS public engagements. Prior to his appointment,

Braun focused on cybersecurity issues. He serves in the President’s Circle on the Chicago Council on Global Affairs and as a strategic advisor to the Department of Homeland Security  and the Pentagon on cybersecurity. He was the co-founder and CEO of CGA. As of 2018, CGA was advising the U.S. Department of Homeland Security on policy, workforce development and other cybersecurity issues. Braun also served as Managing Director of Cambridge Global Capital where he identifies investment opportunities and raises capital for cybersecurity and other start-up companies.

In 2017, following intelligence reports highlighting Russian hacking attempts and interference in the 2016 presidential election, Braun co-founded DEF CON’s Voting Village as an effort to illuminate vulnerabilities in domestic election security.  The event was renewed in 2018 and 2019 and featured additional components of U.S. election infrastructure including the hacking of mock Secretary of State websites.  In cooperation with DEF CON, Braun has co-authored two works on election infrastructure cyber vulnerabilities, The DEF CON 25 and 26 Voting Village Reports.  

On February 13, 2018, in a hearing titled “Defending Our Democracy: Building Partnerships to Protect America’s Elections,” Braun testified before the U.S. House Homeland Committee on his election security work with CPI and DEF CON.

Braun is the Executive Director for the 2018-founded Cyber Policy Initiative (CPI) at the University of Chicago Harris School of Public Policy. In August 2020, Braun worked with CPI to launch the Election Cyber Surge initiative, an effort to bridge the cyber workforce gap by connecting election officials to volunteer cybersecurity technologists. As a lecturer at the Harris School, his courses include "Cyber Security in the Digital Age" and "The Intersection of Cyber Threats and Human Rights."

In February 2021, Braun was appointed as a Senior Advisor to the DHS Management Directorate. His initial focus will be on managing and recruiting cybersecurity professionals.

Publications
Braun is the author of a book on the subject of election security entitled 'Democracy in Danger: How Hackers and Activists Exposed Fatal Flaws in the Election System published by Rowman & Littlefield in 2019, as well as  a June 2020 article in the Boston Review'' entitled "A Perfect Storm of Vulnerabilities Could Determine the 2020 Election."

Awards 
In 2018, Braun was the Gold winner for North American Cybersecurity Educator of the Year and Bronze winner for the North American Cybersecurity Consultant of the Year Awards from Cybersecurity Excellence Awards. Along with the team that wrote the DEF CON Voting Village report, Braun was also Gold winner for the Cybersecurity Project of the Year and finalist for the award for Cybersecurity Team of the Year.

References 

Living people
1975 births
American chief executives
Loyola University Chicago alumni
National Louis University alumni
Troy University alumni
University of Chicago faculty